Plectocomia is a genus of flowering plant in the family Arecaceae native to China, the Himalayas, and Southeast Asia. Plants are dioecious, with male and female flowers produced on separate individuals. It contains the following known species:

 Plectocomia assamica Griff. - Bhutan, Assam, Arunachal Pradesh, Yunnan, Myanmar
 Plectocomia billitonensis Becc. - Belitung
 Plectocomia bractealis Becc.  - Assam
 Plectocomia dransfieldiana Madulid - Perak
 Plectocomia elmeri Becc. - Palawan, Mindanao
 Plectocomia elongata Mart. ex Blume - Indochina, Borneo, Java, Sumatra, Philippines 
 Plectocomia himalayana Griff. - Nepal, Sikkim, Bhutan, Assam, Arunachal Pradesh, Yunnan, Laos, Thailand
 Plectocomia khasyana Griff. - Assam
 Plectocomia longistigma Madulid - Java
 Plectocomia lorzingii Madulid - Sumatra
 Plectocomia macrostachya Kurz - Myanmar
 Plectocomia microstachys Burret - Hainan
 Plectocomia mulleri Blume - Borneo, Malaysia
 Plectocomia pierreana Becc. - Vietnam, Cambodia, Laos, Thailand, Guangdong, Guangxi, Yunnan 
 Plectocomia pygmaea Madulid - Kalimantan

References

 
Flora of tropical Asia
Arecaceae genera
Taxonomy articles created by Polbot
Dioecious plants